Georgina Chloe Eku Edewor-Thorley, otherwise known as Eku Edewor (born 18 December 1986), is a British Nigerian actress, television presenter, and model. She is best known for her work as host of the entertainment television program 53 Extra on Africa Magic.

Early life and education
Edewor was born at Portland Hospital in London, along with her twin sister Kessiana. Her mother is Juliana Edewor, an interior designer, restaurateur, and art collector originally from Delta State. Her father, Hugh Thorley, is British and has worked in the food and beverage supply and logistics industries. Edewor's parents divorced when she was young and both remarried. Her late stepfather, Peter Thomas, was a businessman and lawyer from Lagos. On her mother's side, she is the granddaughter of members of the Nigerian chieftaincy system.

Edewor was raised in both Nigeria and the United Kingdom. She lived in Lagos until the age of 13, receiving her primary education at St. Saviour's School and Grange School. Eku then travelled back to the United Kingdom, where she attended boarding school at the Benenden School for Girls. She travelled often with her family, spending Christmases in Eku, her ancestral village in Delta State, and summers in America, Europe, and other African countries.

Edewor attended Warwick University in Coventry, England. She pursued a degree in English Literature and Theatre Studies, graduating with honours in 2008. She then successfully completed a three-month course in acting for film at the New York Film Academy in 2009.

Career
Edewor's first television appearance was in 2006, when she competed in the reality show Britain’s Next Top Model under the name "Georgina Edewor-Thorley". She appeared in theatre productions while studying at Warwick University and the New York Film Academy. Her first job in the entertainment industry was as a production assistant to producer Damian Jones. She worked at his company DJ Films from September 2008 through October 2009. She appeared in the 2010 film Sex & Drugs & Rock & Roll as "Party Girl".

In 2010, after the loss of her stepfather, Edewor returned to Nigeria to work in her mother's restaurant, the Chardonnay Restaurant and Bar, so that her mother could focus on her career as an interior designer. Five months after she returned, she attended an open audition for co-presenter on 53 Extra (formerly Studio 53 Extra), an entertainment show produced by M-NET and airing on the DStv's Africa Magic channel. 53 Extra is a spin-off of Africa Magic's flagship magazine show Studio 53, which was named for the 53 countries in the African Union. 53 Extra features music, film, fashion, red carpet events, and news about celebrities and industry leaders from across the African continent.

Since landing her role on 53 Extra, Edewor has made several other television appearances; she co-hosted the Big Brother Africa All Stars live red carpet show in 2010, and she has also hosted the Pepsi Top Ten Countdown since 2012. She has appeared in commercials for M-NET's 25th Anniversary and also commercials for Martini. Edewor starred as Sade Coker in the television series The Island, which was shot in 2012 and is due to air in 2015 and played Nicole in the online series How She Left My Brother. For her first major film role, she played principal character Sapphire in the 2013 romantic comedy film Flower Girl. She most recently starred as Victoria in the 2014 film When Love Comes Around, produced by Zynnell Zuh.

She splits most of her time between London, Lagos, and New York City, but also travels a lot within Africa.

Filmography

Film

Television

Web

Awards and nominations

She is also one of the best actor African collaboration in 2014 edition of Ghana movie award

References

External links
 
 53 Extra on DStv

English people of Nigerian descent
Nigerian television personalities
Nigerian female models
Nigerian television actresses
New York Film Academy alumni
Alumni of the University of Warwick
Actresses from London
Nigerian people of English descent
Living people
Actresses from Lagos
Nigerian film actresses
British twins
Nigerian twins
Britain & Ireland's Next Top Model contestants
1986 births
21st-century Nigerian actresses